Miles & Monk at Newport is a split album featuring separate performances by the Miles Davis sextet and the Thelonious Monk quartet at the Newport Jazz Festival, recorded in 1958 and 1963, respectively, and released in June 1964 by Columbia records. Despite the album's title, the two artists do not perform together at either date.

On the first side of the LP was a series of high tempo performances of bebop tunes and other staples of the Davis live repertoire from 1958.  The performance was contemporaneous with Davis' Milestones album.   Aside from the 1973 release Jazz at the Plaza (also a 1958 concert) during the LP era, this was the only legitimate (non-bootleg) recording of a live Davis combo performance earlier than the 1960 Blackhawk recordings.  As such, this performance and Jazz at the Plaza were the only legitimate live recordings representing the Kind of Blue sextet.  On the second side were a few numbers by Thelonious Monk's combo, from a 1963 Newport appearance.  It featured an idiosyncratic appearance by clarinetist Pee Wee Russell. The Miles set was recorded in mono and the Monk set was recorded in stereo, so the mono LP featured a fold-down of the Monk set and the stereo LP featured an electronically re-channeled for stereo remix of the Miles set.

In 1973, an expanded version of the Davis Newport performance was released as the LP Miles & Coltrane.

In 1994 the album was released with the Davis Newport performances expanded and the Monk portion released separately on the 2CD Monk compilation At Newport 1963 & 1965.

Track listing

Original LP
Columbia – CS 8978

CD Reissue
SME Records – SRCS 9732-3

Personnel
Side One personnel
Miles Davis – trumpet
Cannonball Adderley – alto saxophone
John Coltrane – tenor saxophone
Bill Evans – piano
Paul Chambers – bass
Jimmy Cobb – drums

Side Two personnel
Pee Wee Russell – clarinet
Charlie Rouse – tenor saxophone
Thelonious Monk – piano
Butch Warren – bass
Frankie Dunlop – drums

References

Thelonious Monk live albums
Miles Davis live albums
Albums recorded at the Newport Jazz Festival
1964 live albums
albums produced by Teo Macero
Columbia Records live albums
Split albums
1958 in Rhode Island
1963 in Rhode Island